Ramabai Bhimrao Ambedkar is a 2011 Indian biographical film in Marathi language, based on the life of Ramabai Ambedkar also known as Ramai (mother Rama) wife of Dr. Babasaheb Ambedkar. Despite all the hardships, Rambai kept her husband motivated and stood like a rock behind her husband's mission of uplifting the underprivileged classes of the country. This is first film made on Ramabai. The film is directed by Prakash Jadhav and featured Nisha Parulekar, Ganesh Jethe and Dashrath Hatiskar as lead characters. Other popular actors who were roped in for Ramabai Bhimrao Ambedkar (Ramai) are Snehal Velankar and Anil Sutar. The film released on 7 January 2011.

Cast 
 Anil Sutar
 Anuya Bam 
 Amey Potkar 
 R.G. Pawar
 Komal Aapke 
 Khushi Ravrane
 Gajanan Rande
 Ganesh Jethe
 Jayant Yadav
 Datta Borkar
 Datta Redkar
 Dashrath Ragankar
 Vilas Jadhav
 Dashrath Hrutiskar
 Dipjyoti
 Nandkumar Newalkar
 Nimesh Chaudhari
 Nisha Parulekar
 Netra Paradkar
 Paranjpe
 Pooja Joshi
 Prathmesh Pradip
 Pradip Bharankar
 Prabhakar More
 Fadke Guruji

Child artist
 Kirti Sheregar
 Manali Chandradev
 Manoj Takne
 Mahesh Chavhan
 Mahesh Thakur
 Milind Chakradev
 Radheya Pandit
 Rohit Rode
 Vikrant Ukarde
 Vimal Ghatkar 
 Vilas Jadhav 
 Shankar Malekar 
 Sharayu 
 Shailendra Chavhan 
 Sanket Pawar 
 Satish Mule 
 Sadashiv Chavhan
 Sandesh Utekar 
 Sayli Vilankar 
 Sahil Kamble 
 Sonali Mule 
 Snehal Vilankar

Songs 
Songs and singer

 "Barrister Banuni Saheb" – Nandesh Upam
 "Daridryachi Jhal" – Shakuntla Jhadhav
 "Ghalun Pani Tulsila" – Shakuntla Jhadhav
 "Rup Manohar" – Shakuntla Jhadhav
 "Tujhyasang Sansar" – Nandesh Upam
 "Tulas Tu Majhi" – Shakuntla Jhadhav

See also 
 Ramabai (film) - a 2016 Kannada film on the same topic
 Dr. Babasaheb Ambedkar (film) - a 2000 English feature film on Dr. Ambedkar

References 

2011 films
2010s biographical films
2010s Marathi-language films
Films about B. R. Ambedkar
Cultural depictions of B. R. Ambedkar